Aik Mnatsakanian (born 14 October 1995) is a Georgian-born Bulgarian sport wrestler of Armenian descent who competes in the men's Greco Roman category. He has claimed two bronze medals in the World Wrestling Championships both in the men's 72 kg category in 2018 and in 2019. He competed in the men's 77 kg event at the 2020 Summer Olympics in Tokyo, Japan.

In March 2021, he competed at the European Qualification Tournament in Budapest, Hungary hoping to qualify for the 2020 Summer Olympics in Tokyo, Japan. He did not qualify at this tournament but he was able to qualify at the World Olympic Qualification Tournament held in Sofia, Bulgaria.

He won one of the bronze medals in the 77 kg event at the European Wrestling Championships held in Budapest, Hungary. He competed in the 77kg event at the 2022 World Wrestling Championships held in Belgrade, Serbia.

References

External links

 

1995 births
People from Samtskhe–Javakheti
Living people
Bulgarian male sport wrestlers
World Wrestling Championships medalists
Bulgarian people of Armenian descent
European Wrestling Championships medalists
Wrestlers at the 2020 Summer Olympics
Olympic wrestlers of Bulgaria
20th-century Bulgarian people
21st-century Bulgarian people